Recce  is a production term used in the UK, Europe, India, Australia, New Zealand, South Africa, Malaysia, Singapore, Indonesia and some areas in the United States, which refers to a pre-filming visit to a location to determine its suitability for shooting (commonly carried out by the Director of Photography), including access to necessary facilities and assessment of any potential lighting or sound issues, and is closely related to location scouting. In the US, the term "site survey" or "tech scout" is commonly used with the same meaning.

Origins
"Recce" is borrowed from the military expression of the same name, which derived from "reconnaissance" in the noun sense and "reconnaître" in the verb sense.

Radio and TV
The term "recce" is also used to refer to scouting recording or broadcast locations for radio and TV production.

See also
 Location shooting

References

Filmmaking occupations
Film and video terminology